Minuscule 65 (in the Gregory-Aland numbering), ε 135 (von Soden), formerly known as Ussher 2, is a Greek minuscule manuscript of the New Testament, on parchment leaves. Palaeographically it has been assigned to the 11th century. The manuscript has complex contents including marginalia.

Description 

The codex contains a complete text of the four Gospels on 309 leaves (size ). The last verse in the Gospel of John was supplied by a later hand. The text is written in one column per page, 22 lines per page.
There are four decorated head-pieces and ornamental initial letters in colour and gold, one at the beginning of each Gospel.

There is also another division according to the smaller Ammonian Sections (in Matthew 355, Mark 234 - 16:9, Luke 342, John 232 sections), whose numbers are given at the margin with references to the Eusebian Canons (written below Ammonian Section numbers).

There are some notes made by later hand at the margin.

Text 
The Greek text of the codex is a representative of the Byzantine text-type. Aland placed it in Category V.
It is a member of the textual family E (Soden's Ki). According to the Claremont Profile Method it represents the textual family Kx in Luke 1, Luke 10, and Luke 20.

John 5:3,4 is marked by an obelus.

History 

Minuscule 446 probably was rewritten from this manuscript.

In 1674 the archbishop of Proconesus presented this manuscript to John Covel (1637–1722), British chaplain in Constantinople, and in 1677 Covel brought it from Sinai to England along with minuscule 110.
Then the manuscript belonged to Robert Harley, and to his son Edward Harley. In 1753 it was purchased along with other manuscripts of the collection by the British Museum.

The manuscript was examined by John Mill (as Cov. 1) and Griesbach. Griesbach allocated to it number 167 on his list. C. R. Gregory saw it in 1883.

It is currently housed at the British Library as a part of the Harleian Collection (Harley MS 5776).

See also 

 List of New Testament minuscules
 Biblical manuscript
 Textual criticism
 Codex Ussher 1

References

Further reading 

 Cyril Ernest Wright, Fontes Harleiani: A Study of the Sources of the Harleian Collection of Manuscripts in the British Museum (London: British Museum, 1972), p. 116.
 See bibliography to the Family E

External links 
 Codex Harleianus 5776 at the British Library

Greek New Testament minuscules
11th-century biblical manuscripts
Harleian Collection